Elections to Maidstone Borough Council in Kent, United Kingdom are held each year to elect one-third of its members, followed by one year without election. Since the last boundary changes in 2002, 55 councillors have been elected from 26 wards. From 2023 onwards, the format of elections will change, with all 55 councillors being elected once every 4 years.

Political control
The first election to the council was held in 1973, initially operating as a shadow authority before coming into its powers on 1 April 1974. Political control of the council since 1973 has been held by the following parties:

Leadership
The leaders of the council since 1987 have been:

Council elections
1973 Maidstone Borough Council election
1976 Maidstone Borough Council election
1979 Maidstone Borough Council election (New ward boundaries)
1980 Maidstone Borough Council election
1982 Maidstone Borough Council election
1983 Maidstone Borough Council election
1984 Maidstone Borough Council election (Borough boundary changes took place but the number of seats remained the same)
1986 Maidstone Borough Council election
1987 Maidstone Borough Council election (Borough boundary changes took place but the number of seats remained the same)
1988 Maidstone Borough Council election
1990 Maidstone Borough Council election
1991 Maidstone Borough Council election
1992 Maidstone Borough Council election
1994 Maidstone Borough Council election
1995 Maidstone Borough Council election
1996 Maidstone Borough Council election
1998 Maidstone Borough Council election
1999 Maidstone Borough Council election
2000 Maidstone Borough Council election
2002 Maidstone Borough Council election (New ward boundaries)
2003 Maidstone Borough Council election
2004 Maidstone Borough Council election
2006 Maidstone Borough Council election
2007 Maidstone Borough Council election
2008 Maidstone Borough Council election
2010 Maidstone Borough Council election
2011 Maidstone Borough Council election (Some new ward boundaries)
2012 Maidstone Borough Council election
2015 Maidstone Borough Council election
2016 Maidstone Borough Council election
2018 Maidstone Borough Council election
2019 Maidstone Borough Council election
2021 Maidstone Borough Council election (postponed from 2020 due to the COVID-19 pandemic)
2022 Maidstone Borough Council election 
2023 Maidstone Borough Council election (last elections held under old format)
2024 Maidstone Borough Council election (first election under 4-year cycle)
2028 Maidstone Borough Council election

Borough result maps

By-elections

1994-1998

1998-2002

2002-2006

2006-2010

2010-2014
A by-election was held in Allington Ward following the death of Malcolm Robertson on 10 August 2012.

2014-2018

2018-2022

References

External links
Maidstone Borough Council

 
Maidstone
Maidstone